Balaji Rao is an Indian name. People with this name include:

 Balaji Baji Rao, Maratha Peshwa and general
 R. Balaji Rao, Indian politician
 Bajaji Rao Naik Nimbalkar, Maratha nobleman and 
 Balaji Rao (Canadian cricketer), Indo-Canadian cricketer
 Balaji Rao (Indian cricketer), Indian cricketer